Wali Rahmani (5 June 1943 – 3 April 2021) was an Indian Sunni Islamic scholar and academician who founded Rahmani30. He was a member of the Bihar Legislative Council from 1974 to 1996. He served as the general secretary of the All India Muslim Personal Law Board and Sajjada Nashin of the Khanqah Rahmani in Munger.

Biography
Wali Rahmani was born to  Minatullah Rahmani, an Islamic scholar who helped found the All India Muslim Personal Law Board.  His grandfather Muhammad Ali Mungeri was one of the co-founders of Nadwatul Ulama. 

Rahmani was appointed the Sajjada Nashin of Khanqah Rahmani, in Munger, in 1991 after the death of his father.

Shah Imran Hasan has written Rahmani's biography entitled Hayat-e-Wali.

Rahmani's spiritual chain goes back to Fazle Rahman Ganj Muradabadi.

Rahmāni died on 3 April 2021.

References

External links
 All India Muslim Personal Law Board
 Welcome to PRAGMATIC
 Wali Rahmani projected as Deputy CM of Bihar
 AIMPLB to boycott UCC 
 Rahmani Mission

1943 births
2021 deaths
Deobandis
Scholars from Bihar
Indian Sunni Muslim scholars of Islam